Marie Marguerite Bouvet (14 February 1865 – 27 May 1915) was a writer of children's books.

Born in New Orleans to French parents, she lived most of her childhood with her paternal grandparents in Lyon, France. She went to Loquet-Leroy Female Institute in New Orleans for school. She graduated in 1885 from St. Mary's College in Knoxville Illinois. Her first book was published in 1890, titled Sweet William.

She died in Reading, Pennsylvania where she was living.

Principle works  
 Sweet William (1890) 
 Little (1885) 
 Prince Tip-Top (1892) 
 My Lady (1894) 
 A Child of Tuscany (1895) 
 Pierrette (1896) 
 A Little House in Pimlico (1897) 
 Tales of an Old Château (1899) 
 Fluers de Poétes et des Prosateurs Français (1900) 
 Bernardo and Laurette (1901) 
 The Smile of the Sphinx (1911)

References  

1865 births
1915 deaths
Writers from New Orleans
Writers from Lyon
American women novelists
American educators
19th-century American women writers